Brenda Shannon Greene (born May 2, 1958), known professionally as Shannon, is an American singer and songwriter of freestyle and dance-pop music. She is best known for her single "Let the Music Play", which topped the Billboard Dance Club Songs chart in 1983 and was certified gold.

Her studio albums include Let the Music Play (1984), followed by Do You Wanna Get Away (1985) and Love Goes All the Way (1986). In 1999, Shannon appeared in a segment of VH1's One-Hit Wonders, and returned to music with her fourth studio album The Best Is Yet to Come (2000). Her most recent studio album, A Beauty Returns, was released in 2006.

Career
Shannon was born in Washington, D.C., United States. In 1983, she was enrolled at York College in New York City and toured with the New York Jazz Ensemble. Quintin Hicks, an associate of the production team of Mark Liggett and Chris Barbosa, saw Shannon singing with a live band in her cousin's recording studio. She auditioned for Liggett and Barbosa with the song "She Can't Love You Like I Do". They introduced her to the selection "Fire and Ice", which would later evolve into Shannon's signature song, "Let The Music Play"; its unique sound, called "the Shannon Sound", would later come to be known as "freestyle". Let The Music Play would also be the title of Shannon's debut album, which she released through the team in 1984.

In July 1983, "Let The Music Play" was released on New York-based dance label Emergency and Shannon was invited back to record more songs with Liggett and Barbosa. The single reached #8 on the Billboard Hot 100 and #2 on the Billboard R&B and #1 on the Hot Dance Club Play charts. It also was ranked at #49 of Billboard's Top 100 songs of 1984. It was later ranked #23 among Billboard's best dance songs of all-time.

Her debut album, Let The Music Play, was released on February 1, 1984. "Give Me Tonight", the follow-up single, reached the number-two spot on the R&B charts and number one on the Hot Dance Club Play charts. The song went to number 46 on the pop charts. It was one of Billboard'''s top 30 dance songs for the year of 1984. In the United States, the third single was "My Heart's Divided". The single, featuring Jimi Tunnell as one of the back up vocalists, hit #3 on the Dance Chart. "Sweet Somebody", a mid-tempo soul effort, made the Top 20 in a few European nations.

Shannon's album Let the Music Play went on to sell approximately 1.5 million worldwide, with 500,000 of those sold in the United States, earning gold certification. Shannon was nominated for a Grammy Award and received numerous other awards, including the Dinah Washington (Jack the Rapper) Award, the Hall of Fame Award, the Gold Ampex Reel Award, a certified gold disc by the Recording Industry Association of America, and the Best Billboard Top 10 female R&B vocalist.

In 1985, she released her second album, Do You Wanna Get Away. The title track was the first single and it became her third single to appear on the Hot 100, and her third single to hit #1 on the Dance Chart. She scored three more dance hits, including "Stronger Together", a cover of "Urgent" by Foreigner, and "Stop the Noise", with a video sponsored by Pepsi and Black Angus. Love Goes All the Way, Shannon's third album, was released in 1986.

Shannon asked to be released from her recording contract with Atlantic Records in 1987. She recorded soundtracks, jingles, and the track "Criminal", for the movie Fatal Beauty, starring Whoopi Goldberg. While touring the world, Shannon attended and graduated from the American Academy of Dramatic Arts in New York City.

In 1998, she cowrote and sang on multi-tracks produced by Todd Terry, Tony Moran, and Germany's Sash! and Les Rythmes Digitales. The Shannon single "Move Mania" (Sash!) became an EU dance hit. In 1999, Shannon appeared in a segment of VH1's One-Hit Wonders. Entertainment Tonight also taped a special about her life. She was managed for a period of time by Eric Vega producer of shows and events. In 2005 the NBC TV show "Hit Me Baby One More Time" aired a full interview on Shannon's life, music, and a pre-taped performance in front of a studio audience for national airing.

Shannon's fourth studio album, The Best Is Yet to Come, was released on March 28, 2000. She is credited as 50 percent writer of the album. Chris Barbosa served as a producer, along with Andy "Panda" Tripoli and Tony Moran. This venture thrust Shannon back onto the dance scene and Billboard Music Charts in the early 2000s with top 10 Billboard Dance Remixes by veteran DJ/Mixer Junior Vasquez (For "Let The Music Play - The Lost Mixes" - #3 US Billboard Music Dance Charts), and Hex Hector for "Give Me Tonight". Shannon later released a compilation album, Let The Music Play: The Best of Shannon, in 2004.

On April 20, 2006, Shannon participated in the Freestyle Extranvaganza concert along with artists Lisa Lisa and Cult Jam, The Cover Girls, Coro, and Stevie B. The event was sponsored by WKTU, WSKQ, and WCAA in New York.

A fifth studio album, A Beauty Returns, was released in 2006. Today, Shannon is a voting member of the Grammy's (Recording Academy), and she occasionally performs shows around the world. In 2016, Carnival Cruise Lines ran a national television campaign featuring music performed by her. In 2017, Shannon was a contestant on the FOX game show Beat Shazam where she was partnered with former Stetsasonic member Bobby Simmons.

Personal life

Shannon has never married and has no children.

Discography
Studio albums

CompilationsPart Time Lovers (1991)The Collection (1994)The Ultimate Collection (1994)Dancefloor Artists Volume 8 - The Best Of Shannon (1995)The Collection (Reissue) (2001)Let the Music Play: The Best of Shannon'' (2004)

Singles

Featured singles

See also
List of number-one dance hits (United States)
List of artists who reached number one on the U.S. Dance chart

References

External links
Shannon's MySpace page
 

20th-century African-American women singers
American freestyle musicians
Living people
Singers from Washington, D.C.
Musicians from Brooklyn
People from New York City
American pop musicians
1958 births
Atco Records artists
21st-century African-American people
21st-century African-American women